Nagaram Sagaram is a 1974 Indian Malayalam-language film, directed and produced by K. P. Pillai. The film stars Sukumari, KPAC Lalitha, Adoor Bhasi and Thikkurissy Sukumaran Nair. The film had musical score by G. Devarajan.

Cast
Sukumari
KPAC Lalitha
Adoor Bhasi
Thikkurissy Sukumaran Nair
Sreelatha Namboothiri
Raghavan
Bahadoor
Sumithra

Soundtrack
The music was composed by G. Devarajan and the lyrics were written by Sreekumaran Thampi.

References

External links
 

1974 films
1970s Malayalam-language films